This is a list of 1967 events that occurred in the Socialist Republic of Romania.

Incumbents
President: Nicolae Ceaușescu
Prime Minister: Ion Gheorghe Maurer

Events

January

 January 5 – Romania and Spain sign a consular and commercial agreement.
 January 31 – Romania establishes diplomatic relations with West Germany.

September

 September 19 – Former Foreign Minister Corneliu Mănescu of Romania was elected as the first President of the United Nations General Assembly to represent a Communist nation.

December

 December 9 – Nicolae Ceaușescu, the Secretary-General of the Romanian Communist Party, is elected as the new President of Romania by unanimous vote of the nation's 451-member Grand National Assembly.

Births

March
 March 6 – Mihai Tudose, Romanian politician and former Prime Minister of Romania.
 March 30 – Albert-László Barabási, Romanian-born Hungarian-American physicist.

May
 May 6 – Daniel Tătaru, Romanian mathematician at the University of California, Berkeley.

July
 July 16 – Mihaela Stănuleț, retired Romanian artistic gymnast

October
 October 6 – Attila Ambrus, Romanian-born Hungarian bank robber and professional ice hockey player.

December
 December 22 – Dan Petrescu, Romanian footballer

Deaths

July
 July 3 – Ioan Lupaș, historian, academic, politician, Orthodox theologian, and priest; member of the Romanian Academy (born 1880).
 July 14 – Tudor Arghezi (Ion N. Theodorescu), Romanian novelist and poet (born 1880).

October
 October 15 – Ștefan S. Nicolau, physician, titular member of the Romanian Academy (born 1896).

References

Years of the 20th century in Romania
1960s in Romania
 
Romania
Romania